Burford Sampson DSO (30 March 1882 – 5 June 1959) was an Australian politician and soldier. Born in Launceston, Tasmania, he was educated at Launceston Grammar School before serving in the military 1899–1901, during the Second Boer War. He remained in Africa, serving with the Rhodesian Mountain Police and farming in South Africa. He returned to Tasmania in 1907 as a farmer. He served in World War I (1914–1918) and was at the landing at Gallipoli, before serving on the Western Front and briefly commanding the 15th Battalion during their final battle around Jeancourt in September 1918. After the war, he became a manager in Launceston. In 1925, he was elected to the Australian Senate as a Nationalist Senator for Tasmania. Sampson served as Chairman of Committees from 1935 to 1938. He was defeated at the 1937 federal election (his term finishing in June 1938), but was re-elected in 1940. He was defeated again in 1946 as a Liberal.

Sampson died in 1959, aged 77.

References

1882 births
1959 deaths
Australian Army officers
Australian military personnel of the Second Boer War
Australian military personnel of World War I
Companions of the Distinguished Service Order
Liberal Party of Australia members of the Parliament of Australia
Members of the Australian Senate
Members of the Australian Senate for Tasmania
Nationalist Party of Australia members of the Parliament of Australia
Politicians from Launceston, Tasmania
United Australia Party members of the Parliament of Australia
20th-century Australian politicians
People educated at Launceston Church Grammar School
British South Africa Police officers